Flowering Judas and Other Stories is a collection of 10 works of short fiction by Katherine Anne Porter, published by  Harcourt, Brace and Company in 1935. The volume is an amalgamation of four previously uncollected works and the six stories comprising Porter's first collection, Flowering Judas (1930), also published by Harcourt and Brace. All of these stories appear in The Collected Stories of Katherine Anne Porter (1965).

Stories

The original year of publication is listed below after the titles. The publishers include: The Century Magazine, Transition. New Masses, Gyroscope, Virginia Quarterly Review, Hound & Horn, Harrison of Paris, Scribner's Magazine and The Caravan
The first six stories in this list comprise the contents of the 1930 collection Flowering Judas. The other four stories listed below were first collected in Flowering Judas and Other Stories.

"María Concepción" (The Century Magazine,  December 1922)
"Magic" (Transition, Summer 1928)
"Rope" (The Caravan, 1928)
"He" (New Masses, October 1927)
"Theft"(Gyroscope, November 1929)
"That Tree" (Virginia Quarterly Review, July 1934)
"The Jilting of Granny Weatherall" (Transition, February 1929)
"Flowering Judas" (Hound & Horn, spring 1930)
"The Cracked Looking-Glass" (Scribner's Magazine, May 1932)
"Hacienda" (Virginia Quarterly Review, October 1932)

Reception

With reference to the six stories in the volume first collected in 1930,  John Chamberlain of The New York Times wrote: "After five years, the intensity of these stories seems just as important as it did when they were originally published." Commenting on the earliest stories in the collection, Yvor Winters in Hound & Horn wrote: "I can think of no living American who has written short stories at once so fine in detail, so powerful as u nits, and so mature and intelligent in outlook…"

Critic Eleanor Clark, writing in The New Republic, offered qualified praise for the works in the collection:

Clark selects three of the stories for special praise—"Flowering Judas", "Maria Concepción" and "The Cracked Looking Glass"—considering these "almost perfect by any standard [achieved through] understatement, rigid selection and sympathetic music in the words…" Regarding "Hacienda", Clark deems the work "superficial...not pointed enough to give contour to any of the people involved."

William Troy of The Nation provided this measured appraisal of the collection:

Footnotes

Sources 
  Clark, Eleanor. 1935. Flowering Judas and Other Stories. The New Republic, December 1939 in Critical Essays on Katherine Anne Porter. p.27-28. Editor, Darlene Harbour Unrue. G. K. Hall and Company, New York. 
Unrue, Darleen Harbour. 2008. Editor in Katherine Anne Porter: Collected Stories and Other Writings. Literary Classics of the United States (Compilation, notes and chronology), New York. The Library of America Series (2009). 
Unrue, Darlene Harbour. 1997. Critical Essays on Katherine Anne Porter. Editor, Darlene Harbour Unrue. G. K. Hall and Company, New York. 
Schwartz, Edward. 1953. Katherine Anne Porter: A Critical Bibliography. The Folcroft Press, Inc., Forcroft, PA. Reprinted from the Bulletin of the New York Public Library, May 1953. 

1935 short story collections
American short story collections
Short fiction about time travel